Ubaydallāh ibn al-Hasan ibn al-Huṣayn al-ʿAnbarī, simply known as Ubaydallah al-Anbari (died 168 AH/784–5 AD) was an Arab jurist, poet, lexicographer, genealogist and a governor under the Abbasid Caliphate. He was highly distinguished for coining the popular saying: "kullu mujtahid musib", roughly translated as "every earnest exercise of interpretation results in an acceptable conclusion".

Life 
Ubayd Allah was born in Basra between 718/9 and 724/5 AD. He stemmed from a notable Basran family of jurists, belonging to the Arab tribe of Tamim. He was appointed in 773 AD as qadi and governor of Basra by the Abbasid caliph al-Mansur (r. 754–775) succeeding the qadi Sewar ibn Abdallah al-Anbari. As governor he tried to keep his office independent, but he was restricted from pursuing his own policies and was only dependent on Baghdad. Al-Anbari regarded himself as the advocate of the people; while judging a case involving the caliph, he reportedly remained in his seat when the caliph entered the court. In the year 783 AD, under the succeeding caliph al-Mahdi (r. 775–785), al-Anbari was removed from his office as a governor of Basra by the order of the caliph. According to Tarikh Baghdad by al-Khatib al-Baghdadi, al-Anbari was dismissed because he refused an order from the caliph al-Mahdi to find in favor for a military leader against a merchant in a case.

References

See also 
List of pre-modern Arab scientists and scholars

8th-century Arabs
8th-century jurists
8th-century people from the Abbasid Caliphate
8th-century lexicographers
8th-century Arabic poets
8th-century births
Abbasid governors of Basra
784 deaths
Year of birth uncertain
Arabic-language poets
People from Basra
Banu Tamim
Taba‘ at-Tabi‘in hadith narrators